Thug Love may refer to:

"Thug Love" (song) a song by 50 Cent
"Thug Luv", a song by Bone Thugs-n-Harmony
"Thug Luv", a song by DJ Kayslay